Turi and the Paladins (Italian: Turi e i Paladini) is a 1977 Italian family film directed by Angelo D'Alessandro.

Cast
   Rocco Aloisi as Salvatore a 6 anni  
 Kitty Arancio   as Concettina a 12 anni  
 Claudio Baturi  as Salvatore a 12 anni  
 Rosalino Cellamare  as Salvatore a 19 anni  
 Riccardo Cucciolla  as Don Saverio  
 Mirella D'Angelo as Concettina a 19 anni  
 Jessica Dublin  as Americana  
 Gilberto Idonea  as Don Alfonso  
 Sara Micalizzi as Suor Cecilia  
 Francesco Sineri  as Don Carmelo

References

Bibliography
 Brunetta, Gian Piero. The History of Italian Cinema: A Guide to Italian Film from Its Origins to the Twenty-first Century.  Princeton University Press, 2009.

External links

1977 films
Italian children's films
1970s Italian-language films
1970s Italian films